LaSalle—Émard was a federal electoral district in the Canadian province of Quebec that was represented in the House of Commons of Canada from 1988 to 2015. Its population in 2001 was 99,767. The MP from 1988 to 2008 was Paul Martin, who served as prime minister of Canada from 2003 to 2006. As part of redistribution begun in 2012 the riding is now known by its current name and boundaries of LaSalle—Émard—Verdun while the southwestern portion joined the new riding of Dorval—Lachine—LaSalle.

Geography
The district included the Montreal borough of LaSalle and the Southwest borough's Ville-Émard and Côte-Saint-Paul neighbourhoods. The neighbouring ridings were Notre-Dame-de-Grâce—Lachine, Westmount—Ville-Marie, Jeanne-Le Ber, Brossard—La Prairie and Châteauguay—Saint-Constant.

Political geography
Historically, the LaSalle part of the riding was fairly Liberal-leaning, with a few Bloc pockets in the west. Meanwhile, Ville-Émard and Côte-Saint-Paul were mostly Bloc areas. However, the division was swept over by the NDP surge in the 2011 Canadian federal election.

History
The electoral district was created in 1987 from LaSalle, Saint-Henri—Westmount and Verdun—Saint-Paul ridings.

Member of parliament

This riding elected the following member of parliament:

Election results

	

Change from 2000 for top three parties is based on redistributed results. Conservative Party change is based on the total of Canadian Alliance and Progressive Conservative Party totals.

See also
 List of Canadian federal electoral districts
 Past Canadian electoral districts

References

Campaign expense data from Elections Canada
2011 Results from Elections Canada
Riding history from the Library of Parliament
Map of riding archived by Elections Canada

Notes

Former federal electoral districts of Quebec
LaSalle, Quebec